Mudiyansege Suddahamy Dissanayake was a Ceylonese politician. He was the member of the Parliament of Sri Lanka for Kalawewa, representing the Sri Lanka Freedom Party and defeating Sir Richard Aluvihare of the United National Party at the 3rd parliamentary election.

References

Members of the 3rd Parliament of Ceylon
Sri Lanka Freedom Party politicians
Sinhalese politicians
Date of birth missing
Date of death missing
Year of birth missing
Year of death missing